The 1922 Dayton football team was an American football team that represented the University of Dayton as an independent during the 1922 college football season. In its first and only season under head coach Van F. Hill, the team compiled a 6–3 record.

Schedule

References

Dayton
Dayton Flyers football seasons
Dayton football